Mattias Karlsson may refer to:

 Mattias Karlsson (orienteer) (born 1972), Swedish orienteering competitor
 Mattias Karlsson (ice hockey) (born 1985), Swedish professional ice hockey player
 Mattias Karlsson (politician) (born 1977), Swedish politician
 Mattias Falck, (né Karlsson) Swedish table tennis player